The Vijay Award for Best Cinematographer is given by STAR Vijay as part of its annual Vijay Awards ceremony for Tamil  (Kollywood) films.

The list
Here is a list of the award winners and the films for which they won.

Nominations 
2006 P. C. Sriram - Varalaru
Ravi Varman - Vettaiyaadu Vilaiyaadu
Nirav Shah - Pattiyal
2007 Velraj - Polladhavan
S. R. Kathir - Kattradhu Thamizh
Ramji - Paruthiveeran
K. V. Anand - Sivaji : The Boss
Nirav Shah - Billa
2008 S. R. Kathir - Subramaniapuram
Mahesh Muthuswami - Anjathey
R. Rathnavelu - Vaaranam Aayiram
Ravi Varman - Dasavathaaram
Sakthi Saravanan - Saroja
2009 Manoj Paramahamsa - Eeram
Nirav Shah - Sarvam
P. C. Sriram - Yaavarum Nalam
Rajesh Yadhav - Pokkisham
Tirru - Kanchivaram
2010 R. Rathnavelu - Enthiran
Santhosh Sivan - Raavanan
Nirav Shah - Madrasapattinam
M. Sukumar - Mynaa
Richard M. Nathan - Angadi Theru
2011 P. S. Vinod - Aaranya Kaandam
Om Prakash - Vaagai Sooda Vaa
Nirav Shah - Deiva Thirumagal
Ravi K. Chandran - 7aum Arivu
Velraj - Aadukalam
2012 Gopi Amarnath - Pizza
Prem - Naduvula Konjam Pakkatha Kaanom
Vijay Milton - Vazhakku Enn 18/9
Siddharth - Aravaan
Sukumar - Thadaiyara Thaakka
 2013 Rajiv Menon - Kadal
 Chezhiyan - Paradesi
 George C. Williams - Raja Rani
 Marc Koninckx - Maryan
 Sanu John Varghese - Vishwaroopam
 2014 Gavemic U Ary - Jigarthanda
G. Murali - Madras
Gokul Benoy - Pannaiyarum Padminiyum
R. D. Rajasekhar - Arima Nambi
Nirav Shah - Kaaviya Thalaivan

See also
 Tamil cinema
 Cinema of India

References

Cinematographer
Awards for best cinematography